Liliana del Carmen La Rosa Huertas (born 30 May 1964) is a Peruvian nurse and academic specializing in public policy. She was Minister of Development and Social Inclusion of Peru from 2 April 2018 to 11 March 2019, during the government of Martín Vizcarra.

Biography
Liliana La Rosa was born in Huacho District on 30 May 1964, the daughter of Alfonsa Huertas and Andrés La Rosa. Her primary and secondary education took place at the Colegio Santa Rosa de las Madres Dominicas del Rosario. In 1981 she entered , part of its first Nursing class, which she attended for two semesters.

She then entered Universidad Nacional Federico Villarreal's Children's Hospital Nursing School in Lima, from which she earned a baccalaureate and licentiate in nursing.

Professional studies
In 1989 and 1990, La Rosa completed a Diploma of Sociological Studies at the Pontifical Catholic University of Peru (PUCP), and in 1991 she entered the Master of Community Health program with mention in Maternal Childhood and Population at Cayetano Heredia University (UPCH). In 1995 she won an IADB scholarship to study at the University of Chile's Faculty of Industrial Engineering in its Master of Management and Public Policy program.

In 1999 she completed training in international health at the Pan American Health Organization in Washington, D.C.

Career

She was coordinator of the Pathfinder Fund Program from the non-governmental organization PROFAMILIA, from which the first 12 specialized public services for adolescents were created.

In 1996 she founded the Peruvian Society for Adolescence and Youth, and served as its executive director on two occasions.

In 2008, she was appointed advisor to the Minister of Health and then the ministry's director general of international cooperation, serving in this role until August 2011. At the end of 2011, she joined the National Civil Service Authority's Body of Public Managers as its manager of social development.

In 2012, La Rosa was appointed director of international cooperation and negotiation of the Ministry of Foreign Affairs' Agency for International Cooperation. She later headed the Directorate of Policies and Programs, functions that culminated in her being assigned as a Public Manager of the PCM as head of international cooperation. In 2015 she served as the Ministry of Labor's director general of cooperation and international relations.

Later, she worked as a full-time professor at the PUCP Faculty of Social Sciences, a position that includes teaching at its School of Government and Public Policy.

National Dean of the College of Nurses of Peru
On 1 May 2017, La Rosa was part of the foundation of the #Súmate Movement, through which she won the national election for National Dean of the College of Nurses of Peru. She was sworn in on 29 January 2018. During her tenure, the nursing ombudsman position was created, and a legislative initiative was presented to approve the Law to Create the Program for the Protection of Orphans from Feminicide.

After completing her term at the Minister of Development and Social Inclusion on 12 March 2019, she resumed her position as National Dean of the College of Nurses of Peru. In this role, she led the World Nursing Now Campaign at the national level in 2019.

Minister of Development and Social Inclusion of Peru
On 2 April 2018, Liliana La Rosa was sworn in as Minister of Development and Social Inclusion of Peru, joining the Villanueva cabinet of Martín Vizcarra's government. Her appointment caused controversy in some sectors, recalling that she had been a member of the Broad Front, a conglomerate of leftist groups that had contributed to the fall of the previous government of Pedro Pablo Kuczynski. La Rosa defended herself by saying that she had resigned from the Broad Front months before, when she was elected National Dean of the College of Nurses.

Selected publications

References

External links
 National Directive Council of the College of Nurses of Peru

1964 births
Government ministers of Peru
Living people
Nursing administrators
People from Lima Region
Pontifical Catholic University of Peru alumni
Academic staff of the Pontifical Catholic University of Peru
University of Chile alumni
Women government ministers of Peru
Women nurses